Brian Keith Shaw (born March 22, 1966) is an American professional basketball coach and former player who is an assistant coach for the Los Angeles Clippers of the National Basketball Association (NBA). He could play both guard positions, but was used primarily at point guard over the course of his 14 seasons in the league.

Early life
Shaw grew up in Oakland, California with other future basketball stars such as Antonio Davis, Jason Kidd, and Gary Payton, as well as Demetrius "Hook" Mitchell. In his youth, he was a participant at the East Oakland Youth Development Center, a local community organization where he played basketball. He attended Westlake Middle School and then Bishop O'Dowd High School in Oakland. For college, he attended St. Mary's College of California for his freshman and sophomore years of college, then transferred to UC Santa Barbara for his junior and senior seasons. In his senior year, he was named Pacific Coast Athletic Association (PCAA) player of the year as he led the Gauchos to their first-ever NCAA tournament berth.

Playing career
He was taken with the 24th overall pick by the Boston Celtics in the 1988 NBA draft. In 1988, Shaw signed a one-year contract with the Celtics. In 1989, Shaw signed a two-year contract to play with an Italian team, Il Messaggero Roma. At the end of January 1990, Shaw signed a 5-year deal with the Celtics. In June of that year, Shaw told the Celtics he planned to play for Il Messaggero during the 1990–91 season. The ensuing contract dispute, Boston Celtics v. Brian Shaw, which Shaw lost, became a relatively famous sports law case and is read in many law school contracts classes.

During his NBA career, he played for the Celtics, Miami Heat, Orlando Magic, Golden State Warriors, Philadelphia 76ers, Portland Trail Blazers, and Los Angeles Lakers. He was a member of four squads that made NBA Finals appearances: in 1995 with the Magic and in 2000, 2001, and 2002 with Lakers (winning three NBA championships with the Lakers).

He also played for the US national team in the 1986 FIBA World Championship, winning the gold medal. In the final between the United States and Soviet Union, Shaw hit a key three-pointer in the closing seconds. The American team won the game by two points.

Los Angeles Lakers
Shaw joined the Los Angeles Lakers in 1999, reuniting with former Orlando teammate Shaquille O'Neal. He served as a backup to All-Star shooting guard Kobe Bryant throughout the season and playoffs as the Lakers had the league's best record winning 67 games. Shaw played in all 22 of the Lakers' playoff games as they advanced past the Sacramento Kings and the Phoenix Suns before facing the Portland Trail Blazers in the Western Conference Finals. The Lakers took a 3–1 lead in the series before the Trail Blazers won games 5 and 6 to tie the series at three games apiece. In game 7, the Trail Blazers lead 75-60 in the fourth quarter. The Blazers shot 5 for 23 in the final quarter as the Lakers made a comeback bolstered by two clutch three-point baskets by Shaw. The Lakers won the game and made the NBA Finals to face the Indiana Pacers. Shaw started in game 3 in place of the injured Bryant, and then played critical minutes in the Lakers overtime win in game 4. The Lakers won the series 4–2, and Shaw won his first NBA championship.

Shaw continued to back up Bryant in the 2000–01 season, but started a total of 28 games. He once again played a key role for the Lakers as they steamrolled through the playoffs and defeated the Philadelphia 76ers 4–1 in the 2001 NBA Finals. The Lakers won a third title in the 2001–02 season before losing in the Western Conference Semifinals to the San Antonio Spurs in the 2002–03 season, and Shaw then retired following the season.

Legacy
While a member of the Heat, on April 8, 1993, Shaw hit a then-NBA record ten three-point field goals (out of 15 attempts) against the Milwaukee Bucks at the Bradley Center, finishing with 32 points. Starting in 1994, he was one-half of the popular "Shaw-Shaq Redemption" (named after The Shawshank Redemption), an alley-oop from Shaw to Shaquille O'Neal that was popular with fans in both Orlando and Los Angeles (Shaw and O'Neal were also Laker teammates). In an interview with The Miami Herald in 2007, O'Neal claimed that the teammate he had most respected in his career was Shaw.

On NBA All-Star Weekend in 2000, held in Oakland, Shaw received a key to the City of Oakland along with his fellow Oakland natives Jason Kidd and Gary Payton.

Coaching career

Los Angeles Lakers (2003–2011)
Shaw retired following the 2002–03 season. He worked for the Lakers as an Oakland-based scout during the 2003–04 season. He was appointed assistant coach of the Lakers during the 2004–05 season. He was considered for the Lakers head coaching job following Phil Jackson's retirement, but was ultimately passed over in favor of Mike Brown.

Indiana Pacers (2011–2013)
Shaw left the Lakers to join the Indiana Pacers as an assistant coach. He was later promoted to associate head coach. Shaw was a highly respected assistant coach by other NBA coaches as well as the media.

Denver Nuggets (2014–2015)
After spending two years on the Pacers' bench, on June 25, 2013, Shaw was announced as the head coach of the Denver Nuggets, replacing former coach George Karl. On March 3, 2015, he was fired by the Nuggets after compiling a record of 56–85 (.397) in just under two seasons.

Return to the Lakers (2016–2019)
In June 2016, Shaw returned to the Los Angeles Lakers as the team's newest associate head coach under new head coach Luke Walton's coaching staff.

NBA G League Ignite (2020–2021)
On June 10, 2020, Shaw was named as the inaugural head coach of the G League Ignite. He led the team to an 8–8 record and a playoff berth but stepped down from the role after the season.

Los Angeles Clippers (2021–present)
On September 24, 2021, Shaw was announced as an assistant coach for the Los Angeles Clippers.

Head coaching record

|- 
| style="text-align:left;"|Denver
| style="text-align:left;"|
| 82 || 36 || 46 ||  || style="text-align:center;"|4th in Northwest || — || — || — || —
| style="text-align:center;"|Missed playoffs
|- 
| style="text-align:left;"|Denver
| style="text-align:left;"|
| 59 || 20 || 39 ||  || style="text-align:center;"|(fired) || — || — || — || —
| style="text-align:center;"|—
|- class="sortbottom"
| style="text-align:center;" colspan="2"|Career
| 141 || 56 || 85 ||  ||   || — || — || — || — ||

Personal life
On June 26, 1993, both of Shaw's parents and his sister were killed in a car accident in Nevada. His sister's daughter survived the crash and Shaw, with help from his aunt, helped raise her.

Shaw reportedly dated Madonna when he played for the Miami Heat. Shaw has three children with his wife, Nikki Shaw, who is a professional chef. They met when he was signed as a free agent by the Orlando Magic in 1994 and they married in 1998.

See also

 List of NCAA Division I basketball career triple-doubles leaders

References

External links

1966 births
Living people
1986 FIBA World Championship players
African-American basketball coaches
African-American basketball players
American expatriate basketball people in Italy
American men's basketball players
Basketball coaches from California
Basketball players from Oakland, California
Boston Celtics draft picks
Boston Celtics players
Competitors at the 1986 Goodwill Games
Denver Nuggets head coaches
FIBA World Championship-winning players
Golden State Warriors players
Indiana Pacers assistant coaches
Los Angeles Clippers assistant coaches
Los Angeles Lakers assistant coaches
Los Angeles Lakers players
Miami Heat players
NBA G League Ignite coaches
Orlando Magic players
Pallacanestro Virtus Roma players
Philadelphia 76ers players
Portland Trail Blazers players
Point guards
Saint Mary's Gaels men's basketball players
Shooting guards
UC Santa Barbara Gauchos men's basketball players
United States men's national basketball team players